The 2012 Sarasota Open was a professional tennis tournament played on clay courts. It was the fourth edition of the tournament which was part of the 2012 ATP Challenger Tour. It took place in Sarasota, United States between 16 and 22 April 2012.

Singles main draw entrants

Seeds

 1 Rankings are as of April 9, 2012.

Other entrants
The following players received wildcards into the singles main draw:
  James Blake
  Tim Smyczek
  Mac Styslinger
  Rhyne Williams

The following players received entry from the qualifying draw:
  Brian Baker
  Cătălin Gârd
  Michael Lammer
  Nicholas Monroe

Champions

Singles

 Sam Querrey def.  Paolo Lorenzi, 6–1, 6–7(3–7), 6–3

Doubles

 Johan Brunström /  Izak van der Merwe def.  Martin Emmrich /  Andreas Siljeström, 6–4, 6–1

External links
Official Website
ITF Search
ATP official site

Sarasota Open
Sarasota Open
2012 in American tennis
2012 in sports in Florida